Stemmatophalera is a monotypic moth genus in the family Notodontidae erected by Per Olof Christopher Aurivillius in 1910. Its only species, Stemmatophalera semiflava, was first described by George Hampson in 1910. It is found in Democratic Republic of the Congo, Ivory Coast, South Africa and in Tanzania.

References

Aurivillius, C. 1910c. Lepidoptera – In: Sjöstedt, Y. (ed.) Wissenschaftliche Ergebnisse der schwedischen zoologischen Expedition nach dem Kilimandjaro, dem Meru und den umgebenen Massaisteppen Deutsch-Ostafrikas 1905–06. Part 9. - — :1–56, pls. 1–2.

Notodontidae
Moths of Africa
Insects of West Africa
Insects of Tanzania
Moths described in 1910
Monotypic moth genera